John Hodiak (April 16, 1914 – October 19, 1955) was an American actor who worked in radio, stage and film.

Early life 
Hodiak was born in Pittsburgh, Pennsylvania, the son of Anna (Pogorzelec) and Walter Hodiak. He was of Ukrainian and Polish descent. Hodiak grew up in Hamtramck, Michigan.

Acting career 
Hodiak had his first theatrical experience at age 11, acting in Ukrainian and Russian plays at the Ukrainian Catholic Church. From the moment he first appeared on the stage, he resolved to become an actor. Hodiak was not even swayed when as a third baseman on his local high school baseball team, he was offered a contract with a St. Louis Cardinals farm club. He turned the offer down.

Radio 
When Hodiak first tried out for a radio acting job, he was turned down because of his accent. He became a caddie at a Detroit golf course, then worked at a Chevrolet automobile factory – and practised his diction. When he conquered the diction hurdle, he became a radio actor and moved to Chicago. There Hodiak created the role of the comic strip character Li'l Abner on radio.

Hodiak also had the role of McCullough in the radio soap opera Girl Alone.

Hollywood 
Hodiak arrived in Hollywood in 1942 and signed a motion picture contract with MGM. He refused to change his name, saying "I like my name. It sounds like I look."

Hodiak was cast in a few small parts at MGM, including A Stranger in Town (1943), I Dood It (1943) and Maisie Goes to Reno (1944).

Stardom 

Hodiak then caught the eye of director Alfred Hitchcock, and on loan to 20th Century Fox, he was featured in Lifeboat (1944) opposite Tallulah Bankhead.

MGM cast him in the third lead in Song of Russia (1944), supporting Robert Taylor and Susan Peters. He was Ann Sothern's love interest in Maisie Goes to Reno (1944) and had a role in Marriage Is a Private Affair (1944).

20th Century Fox borrowed Hodiak again to play the title role in Sunday Dinner for a Soldier (1944), with Anne Baxter, whom he married in real life. Fox kept him on to play Maj. Joppolo in A Bell for Adano (1945) with Gene Tierney.

At MGM, Hodiak had a role as Judy Garland's love interest in The Harvey Girls (1946).

Fox gave him a starring role in Somewhere in the Night (1946), directed by Joseph L. Mankiewicz. Hodiak acted with Lucille Ball in MGM's Two Smart People (1946), which lost money, as did the film noir The Arnelo Affair (1947).

Supporting actor 
Hodiak went to Paramount for Desert Fury (1947), playing third lead to Burt Lancaster and Lizabeth Scott. He starred in Love from a Stranger (1947) for Eagle Lion, then supported Lana Turner and Clark Gable in Homecoming (1948). He supported Gable again in Command Decision (1948). The two Gable films were hits but Hodiak was voted "box office poison" by exhibitors at the end of 1948.

Hodiak was down the cast list for The Bribe (1949). He was second billed in MGM's war film Battleground (1949) a huge success. Also popular was Malaya (1949) where Hodiak supported James Stewart and Spencer Tracy.

Hodiak was a love rival for Robert Taylor in Ambush (1950), a popular Western. MGM gave him another lead role, co-starring with Hedy Lamarr in A Lady Without Passport (1950), but it lost money. He was third billed in The Miniver Story (1950), the flop sequel to Mrs. Miniver, and fourth lead in Night into Morning (1951), an unsuccessful drama.

Hodiak supported Spencer Tracy in The People Against O'Hara (1951) and Clark Gable in Across the Wide Missouri (1952). He was second billed to Walter Pidgeon in The Sellout (1953).

Broadway and B movies 
In 1952, Hodiak went to New York City and made his Broadway debut in The Chase by Horton Foote and directed by José Ferrer. The play was a failure, but its star received positive notices.

Hodiak went to Allied Artists to star in the movie Battle Zone (1952). He starred in two Westerns, Ambush at Tomahawk Gap (1953) and Conquest of Cochise (1953), and then the war movies Mission Over Korea (1953) and Dragonfly Squadron (1954).

He originated the role of Lieutenant Maryk in Paul Gregory's production of the play The Caine Mutiny Court Martial (1954–1955) by Herman Wouk adapted from his novel The Caine Mutiny. The play, starring Henry Fonda and Lloyd Nolan, ran for two years, and Hodiak's portrayal brought him acclaim.

When the show closed after its U.S. tour, Hodiak began work on Trial (1955) at MGM, billed fourth as the prosecuting attorney. When it wrapped, he played Major Ward Thomas in On the Threshold of Space (1956) at 20th Century Fox.

Personal life 
Hodiak and actress Anne Baxter (whom he met while they were starring in Sunday Dinner for a Soldier) married on July 7, 1946, and divorced on January 27, 1953. They had one daughter, Katrina Hodiak, who became an actress.

Death 
At age 41, Hodiak suffered a fatal heart attack at his parents' home in Tarzana, California. He was acting in On the Threshold of Space; it was decided that his performance was sufficient to release the movie. He is interred in Block 303, Crypt D-1 of the main mausoleum at Calvary Cemetery, East Los Angeles.
He left an estate of $25,000.

Legacy 
Hodiak has a star on the Hollywood Walk of Fame at 6101 Hollywood Boulevard, for his work in radio.

Filmography

Radio appearances 
A few of Hodiak's many radio appearances:

References

Bibliography 

 Maltin, Leonard. "John Hodiak". Leonard Maltin's Movie Encyclopedia. New York: Dutton, 1994. .

External links 

 
 
 

1914 births
1955 deaths
American male film actors
American male stage actors
American male radio actors
American radio personalities
Male actors from Pittsburgh
American people of Polish descent
American people of Ukrainian descent
Donaldson Award winners
People from Hamtramck, Michigan
Male actors from Michigan
Metro-Goldwyn-Mayer contract players
Burials at Calvary Cemetery (Los Angeles)
20th-century American male actors
Deaths from heart disease